Ri Hyong-jin (born 19 July 1993) is a North Korean international football player. He plays club football with April 25 of the DPR Korea Premier Football League.

International career

International goals
Scores and results list North Korea's goal tally first.

References 
 

1993 births
Living people
North Korean footballers
North Korea international footballers
Association football midfielders